Hisar or Hisarköy is a quarter of the town Davulga, Emirdağ District, Afyonkarahisar Province, Turkey. Its population is 35 (2021).

It is situated in the middle of the site of ancient and Byzantine Amorium. The village was founded in 1892 and spolia from Amorium were used in building it.

References

Populated places in Emirdağ District
Phrygia
Amorium